Ervat (also known as Arvar) is a village in Garmab Rural District, Chahardangeh District, Sari County, Mazandaran Province, Iran. At the 2006 census, its population was 170, in 41 families.

References 

Populated places in Sari County